Persatuan Sepakbola Lembata (simply known as Persebata) is an Indonesian football club based in Lembata Regency, East Nusa Tenggara. They currently compete in the Liga 3 and their homeground is Gelora 99 Stadium.

Players

Current squad

Supporters
Lomblen Mania is the name of the supporter of the Persebata Lembata team. The originator of Lomblen Mania is Jepo Uran. This group of supporters consists of several districts from areas in Lewoleba, Bluwa, Walangkeam, Tujuh Maret, Rayuan, Rimba, Eropaun, Berdikari, Wangatoa, Lamahora, Waijarang, and Woloklaus.

Honours
 El Tari Memorial Cup
 Runner-up: 2022

References

External links

Lembata Regency
Football clubs in Indonesia
Football clubs in East Nusa Tenggara
Association football clubs established in 1999
1999 establishments in Indonesia